George Johnson was a football manager.

He was manager of Leicester City from 1898 to 1 January 1907.
He was in charge for 7 seasons and a total 301 games, he was victorious in 114 of these and lost 115 times.

References

External links

Year of birth missing
Year of death missing
Leicester City F.C. managers
English football managers